Rollins Adams Emerson (May 5, 1873 – December 8, 1947) was an American geneticist who rediscovered the laws of inheritance established by Gregor Mendel.

Early life 

Emerson was born on May 5, 1873 in tiny Pillar Point, New York, but at the age of seven his family moved to Kearney County, Nebraska, where he attended public school and the University of Nebraska-Lincoln. He enrolled in the College of Agriculture there, having developed an interest in the local flora and landscaping while quite young.

Education and Career 

Emerson graduated in 1897 and began work for the Department of Agriculture as an editor, and soon afterwards married Harriet Hardin, with whom he had four children. In 1899 he accepted a position at the University of Nebraska, as an assistant professor of horticulture. In 1910–1911 Emerson took a year's leave of absence to pursue graduate work at Harvard University, which awarded him a doctorate in 1913 with Edward M. East as his supervisor, although Emerson spent only one year at Harvard. Emerson continued his work at the U. of Nebraska until 1914 when he moved to Cornell University in 1914 as professor of plant breeding and head of the department of plant breeding, a position he held until his retirement in 1942. In 1947 he fell ill, and died on December 8, 1947, aged 74.

Research 

Emerson's interests while he was at Nebraska included a wide range of projects including culture methods for different fruit and vegetables and the possibility of domesticating wild plants. Using bean breeding techniques he set up an experiment to establish the same results as Mendel, of whom he had not heard at the time.

While at Nebraska he also became interested in using maize for his research, studying the heritability of pericarp variegation in calico maize.  Ears on plants grown from variegated kernels show one pattern of striping, but the pigmentation of the kernel varies, as does the red area.  Emerson discovered that the more red there was in the kernels planted, the larger the amount of red ears in the progeny. Emerson became one of the first people to suggest that mutations could cause variations in organisms. Cornell University, through Emerson's efforts, became a centre for maize genetics research. His doctoral students include George Wells Beadle, Milislav Demerec, Marcus Morton Rhoades, George F. Sprague, and Lewis Stadler.

Emerson was responsible for setting up The Maize Newsletter (http://www.maizegdb.org/mnl.php) in 1932. In 2018, the R. Emerson lifetime achievement award was named in his honor, and has since been awarded annually by the Maize Genetics Cooperation, an outgrowth of the community established by the maize news letter.

References

Morris, R. 1969. Rollins Adams Emerson. 
Nelson, OE. 1993. A Notable Triumvirate of Maize Geneticists Genetics 135:937-941

External links
National Academy of Sciences Biographical Memoir

1873 births
1947 deaths
American geneticists
American botanists
Cornell University faculty
American medical researchers
People from Jefferson County, New York
People from Kearney County, Nebraska
University of Nebraska–Lincoln alumni
Members of the United States National Academy of Sciences
Harvard University alumni
Scientists from New York (state)